Fables: The Wolf Among Us is a comic book series based on the events of Telltale Games' The Wolf Among Us and published in 2014 by Vertigo Comics. It was written by Lilah Sturges and Dave Justus.

Publication history

Plot

Sales 
The first issue sold an estimated 13,600 copies.

Reception 
According to Comic Book Round Up, comic book series received an average score of 8.1 out of 10 based on 13 reviews. IGN gave Fables: The Wolf Among Us #1 an 8 "Great" Rating. Greg Mcelhatton from Comic Book Resources wrote the first issue "is a nice way for those of us who never played the computer game to finally read its story". Richard Gray from Newsarama gave Fables: The Wolf Among Us #1 an 7 score of 10 and feels "It might not be quite up to scratch with the main series that inspired it, but it is nevertheless a worthy companion to one of the most essential pieces of comic literature in the last few decades". His colleague Edward Kaye gave first issue an 6 score of 10.

References 

2014 comics debuts
Fables (comics)
Comics based on video games